Bulla and Dalhousie (also referred to as Bulla-Dalhousie) was an electoral district of the Victorian Legislative Assembly. It was created in 1927 with the merging of the previous districts of Bulla and Dalhousie, and was abolished in 1945, with most of the territory going into the new Mernda seat. It was a rural electorate on the outskirts of Melbourne, and at its abolition included Broadmeadows, Gisborne, Lancefield and Sunbury.

Members for Bulla and Dalhousie

Election results

References

See also
 Electoral districts of Victoria

Former electoral districts of Victoria (Australia)
1927 establishments in Australia
1945 disestablishments in Australia